Elizabeth Cavert Miller (May 2, 1920 – October 14, 1987) was an American biochemist, known for fundamental research into the chemical mechanism of cancer carcinogenesis, working closely with her husband James A. Miller.

Biography
Miller was the daughter of an economist at the Federal Land Bank in Minneapolis. She studied biochemistry at the University of Minnesota (Bachelor's degree 1941, Master's degree 1943). In 1945 she received her doctorate under Carl Baumann as a Wisconsin Alumni Research Foundation (WARF) Scholar. As a postgraduate, she worked at the McArdle Laboratory for Cancer Research at the University of Wisconsin-Madison, where she and her husband (since 1942) James A. Miller studied chemical carcinogenesis. From 1973 to 1987, she was Deputy Director (Associate Director) of the McArdle Laboratory. She was also a professor of oncology at the University of Wisconsin-Madison. She died of kidney cancer.

In 1947, the Millers discovered that an azo dye could cause cancer by binding to proteins in the livers of rats. [1]. In 1949, they showed that the ability of one substance to affect cancer by the action of another chemical influences the processing in the metabolism, and in 1960 they showed the existence of metabolites that were stronger carcinogens than the starting material. These discoveries also had significance for other areas of toxicology. After the discovery of the exact genetic role of DNA around 1953, the Millers were able to detect the carcinogenic effects of many chemicals as a result of their interaction with DNA. After demonstrating in the 1960s that chemical carcinogens could be detected by increased mutation rates, they examined the carcinogenicity of a wide range of substances found in the environment, industrial chemicals, and food.

Elizabeth Miller was editor of the Cancer Research journal of the American Association for Cancer Research (AACR) from 1954 to 1964 . In 1957, she became the first woman elected to the AACR Board of Directors. From 1976 to 1977 she was President of the AACR. From 1978 to 1980 she was on the Council (Cancer Panel) of the National Cancer Institute. In 1978 she became a member of the National Academy of Sciences and in 1981 she was admitted to the American Academy of Arts and Sciences.

In 1980 she was awarded the Charles S. Mott Prize for Cancer Research with James A. Miller and both received numerous other awards, including the 1975 Papanicolaou Prize and the 1978 Founders Award from the Chemical Institute of Toxicology and the Gairdner Foundation International Award.

Elizabeth Miller had two daughters with James A. Miller.

References

External links
 Biography of James and Elizabeth Miller
 Obituary at the McArdle Laboratory

1920 births
1987 deaths
Members of the United States National Academy of Sciences
American women biochemists
University of Wisconsin–Madison faculty
University of Minnesota College of Science and Engineering alumni
Cancer researchers
20th-century American women
20th-century American people
American women academics